The Digital Catapult is the British government innovation agency for the digital and software industry, developed in conjunction with Innovate UK (former Technology Strategy Board). Digital Catapult functions as advanced digital technology innovation centre, accelerating the adoption of new and emerging technologies with aim of driving regional, national and international growth for UK businesses across the economy.

History

Chief executives
Neil Crockett January 2013 to June 2016 
Jeremy Silver – June 2016 to Date

Jeremy Silver is an investor, author and digital entrepreneur.  He specialises in digital media,  music and immersive technologies. He is CEO of Digital Catapult and Board director of Imaginarium Studios, HammerheadVR and Chair of FeedForward.AI. He is also member of the Creative Industries Council for which he serves as Chair of the Innovation Working Group. He is a member of the British Library Board and on the Experts Panel advising the Made Smarter Commission. He is also an advisor to a number of early stage technology businesses and author of Digital Medieval. He has just written a new book that will be released soon. Digital Catapult will be promoting it over the coming days.

Previously he was Executive Chairman of Semetric  Ltd (a company providing social media big data and real-time analytics for the entertainment industry, sold to Apple) and was the founder CEO of the Featured Artists Coalition (a music industry membership and lobbying organisation).  He was CEO of Sibelius Software (a music notation software company) which sold to Avid Technology in 2006. He was worldwide Vice President of New Media for EMI Music Group in London and in Los Angeles.  Silver co-founded the pioneering  service Uplister, (a Spotify-like playlist- sharing music subscription service), based in San Francisco which was venture backed by August Capital. He was also an early advisor to Shazam Entertainment, sold recently to Apple.

In the early 90s,  Silver was Director of Media Affairs at Virgin Records where he worked closely with many artists including Genesis, Meat Loaf,  Brian Eno, Massive Attack and the Future Sound of cats.

Function
The organisation is there to coordinate knowledge transfer from British universities and to help computing startup companies; it acts in a similar way to a business incubator. Fields of research that the organisation is there to work with include artificial intelligence (AI), machine learning, immersive technology and the Internet of things.

Structure
It is situated in the London Borough of Camden, on the corner of the A501 (London Inner Ring Road) and Mabledon Place, directly north of the headquarters of the National Education Union (former NUT). The Chairman is Andy Green, former chief executive from 2008 to 2012 of Logica.

Digital Catapult NETV
Digital Catapult NETV is in North East England, and runs the NETV Immersive Lab at PROTO in Gateshead.

Digital Catapult Northern Ireland
Digital Catapult Northern Ireland is in the Ormeau Baths Gallery in Belfast.

See also
 British Automation and Robot Association
 Innovation and Networks Executive Agency of the EU
 National Centre for Computing Education at the University of York
 Tech Partnership, former e-skills UK, a sector skills council for the digital industry

References

External links
 Digital Catapult
 Tech Nation

Catapult centres
Information technology organisations based in the United Kingdom
Organisations based in the London Borough of Camden
Science and technology in Northern Ireland
Science and technology in Tyne and Wear